Ian Stapleton (born 6 September 1959 in Kingston, Jamaica) is a former Jamaican sprinter.

At the 1979 Pan American Games he won silver in the 4 × 400 metres relay.

At the 1980 Summer Olympics he was eliminated in the quarterfinal of the 400 metres and in the heat of the 4 × 400 metres relay.

References

External links 
 Profile at Sports-Reference.com

1959 births
Living people
Sportspeople from Kingston, Jamaica
Jamaican male sprinters
Olympic athletes of Jamaica
Athletes (track and field) at the 1980 Summer Olympics
Athletes (track and field) at the 1979 Pan American Games
Pan American Games medalists in athletics (track and field)
Pan American Games silver medalists for Jamaica
Medalists at the 1979 Pan American Games